David Noel Freedman (May 12, 1922 – April 8, 2008) was an American biblical scholar, author, editor, archaeologist, and, after his conversion from Judaism, a Presbyterian minister. He was one of the first Americans to work on the Dead Sea Scrolls. He is the son of the writer David Freedman. He died of a heart ailment.

Life
Freedman was born Noel Freedman in New York City on May 12, 1922, the son of David and Beatrice Freedman. The elder Freedman died in 1936 and Noel adopted his name as a mark of respect. Soon after, he converted to Christianity and became a member of the Presbyterian Church. The New York times misidentified Noel as a girl in David Freedman's obituary.

He attended the City College of New York and he earned his B.A., after which he entered Princeton Theological Seminary, where he earned a Bachelor of Theology degree in 1944. He then went on to study Semitic Languages and Literature at The Johns Hopkins University. In 1947, while he was still a graduate student, the excavation of caves near the Dead Sea was just beginning to unearth thousands of fragments of texts. He became one of the first American scholars to get access and spent twenty years painstakingly studying and translating a scroll of Leviticus, one of the books of the Torah. After earning his doctorate in 1948, he then held a series of professorial and administrative positions at various theological institutions and universities.

As the general editor of several distinguished series, including the Anchor Bible Series (1956–2008), Eerdmans Critical Commentaries (2000–08), and The Bible in Its World (2000–08), and as the editor and author of numerous other award-winning volumes, including the Eerdmans Dictionary of the Bible (2000), Freedman has produced over three hundred and thirty scholarly books. Recent seminal works as an author include The Unity of the Hebrew Bible (1991), Psalm 119:  The Exaltation of Torah (1999), The Nine Commandments (2000) and What Are the Dead Sea Scrolls and Why Do They Matter? (2007). As editor of the Leningrad Codex:  A Facsimile Edition (1998), Freedman and his colleagues brought the world's oldest complete Hebrew Bible to synagogues, churches, libraries and individuals around the world for the first time in history.

In 1995, a Festschrift was published in his honor. Fortunate the Eyes That See: Essays in Honor of David Noel Freedman in Celebration of His Seventieth Birthday included contributions from Francis Andersen, Adele Berlin, Joseph Blenkinsopp, Baruch Halpern, Gary Knoppers, and Choon-Leong Seow.

Freedman died on April 8, 2008.

Teaching positions
 1992–2008: Endowed Chair in Hebrew Biblical Studies at the University of California, San Diego (UCSD).
 1989–97: Program Director for the Study of Religion at UCSD.
 1986–92: Teaches at the University of Michigan and UCSD
 1984–92: Arthur F. Thurnau Professor of Biblical Studies, Univ of Michigan, Ann Arbor
 1971–83: Professor of Biblical Studies, University of Michigan in Ann Arbor
 1966–71: Dean of Faculty at SFTS
 1964–71: Gray Professor of Old Testament Exegesis at San Francisco Theological Seminary (San Anselmo, CA) and the Graduate Theological Union (Berkeley, CA)
 1961–64: James A. Kelso Professor of Hebrew and Old Testament at Pittsburgh Theological Seminary
 1948–64: Professor of Old Testament, Pittsburgh Theological Seminary and Western Theological Seminary, Pittsburgh, PA
 1947–48: Assistant Instructor at The Johns Hopkins University in Baltimore, Maryland
 1946–47: Teaching Fellow, The Johns Hopkins University in Baltimore, Maryland

Excavations
 Albright Institute of Archaeological Research (American Schools of Oriental Research), Jerusalem
 Annual Director, 1969–70, 1976–77

 Ashdod Excavation Project
 Director, 1962–64

Education
 Johns Hopkins University, Baltimore, MD (1945–48), PhD Semitic Languages and Literature
 Princeton Theological Seminary, Princeton, NJ (1941–44), ThB Hebrew Bible
 University of California, Los Angeles, Los Angeles (1938–39), BA Modern European History
 City College of New York, New York (1935–38)

See also

 Francis Andersen
 Frank Moore Cross
 Philip King (historian)

References

External links

 Leading Scholar of the Bible, David Noel Freedman, Dies at 85
 Article about his father, David Freedman

1922 births
2008 deaths
American biblical scholars
American people of Romanian-Jewish descent
American Presbyterian ministers
City College of New York alumni
Clergy from New York City
Contributors to the Anchor Bible Series
Converts to Calvinism from Judaism
Dead Sea Scrolls
Johns Hopkins University alumni
Old Testament scholars
Princeton Theological Seminary alumni
San Francisco Theological Seminary faculty
University of California, Los Angeles alumni
University of California, San Diego faculty
University of Michigan faculty
20th-century American clergy